Djaoeh Dimata (Perfected Spelling: Jauh di Mata; Indonesian for Out of Sight) is a 1948 film from what is now Indonesia written and directed by Andjar Asmara for the South Pacific Film Corporation (SPFC). Starring Ratna Asmara and Ali Joego, it follows a woman who moves to Jakarta to find work after her husband is blinded in an accident. SPFC's first production, Djaoeh Dimata took two to three months to film and cost almost 130,000 gulden.

The first domestically produced feature film to be released in five years, Djaoeh Dimata received favourable reviews, although financially it was outperformed by Roestam Sutan Palindih's Air Mata Mengalir di Tjitarum (released soon after). The film's cast remained active in the Indonesian film industry, some for another 30 years, and SPFC produced six more works before closing in 1949. A copy of the film is stored at Sinematek Indonesia.

Plot

A poor villager, Asrad (Ali Joego), is blinded following a traffic accident and thus unable to work. As a result, his wife Soelastri (Ratna Asmara) travels to the capital, Jakarta, to find a job. As Asrad does not trust his wife and fears she may be unfaithful, he writes her a letter telling her not to return. Soelastri becomes a singer, and – unknown to Asrad – soon achieves wide acclaim. Her most popular song, "Djaoeh Dimata", receives heavy airplay on the radio and soon becomes one of Asrad's favourites. Ultimately Soelastri is brought home by Soekarto (Iskandar Sucarno), who attempts to pass her off as a maid for Asrad. When Asrad recognises his wife's voice, they are reconciled.

Background
The first two years of the 1940s saw a growth in the cinema of the Dutch East Indies, with over forty domestic productions released. Following the Japanese occupation in February 1942, production slowed greatly and nearly all film studios were closed. The last studio, the ethnic Chinese-owned Multi Film, was confiscated by the Japanese to establish the film production company Nippon Eigasha in Jakarta, the colony's capital. This included Multi Film's equipment, with which Nippon Eigasha produced one feature film – Rd Ariffien's Berdjoang (Struggle; 1943) – six short films, and several newsreels. All were pro-Japanese propaganda.

After the Japanese surrender in August 1945, a number of native Indonesian employees of Nippon Eigasha formed Berita Film Indonesia, which first made use of the studios. This company was allied with the newly proclaimed Indonesian government. During the ensuing revolution, allied Dutch and British forces occupied Jakarta in November 1945. The Dutch took over the studio, and production of newsreels at Multi Film's studios began in 1947 under the banner Regerings Film Bedrijf. The following year the Dutch established a subsidiary company to produce fictional films. This new company, the South Pacific Film Corporation (SPFC), was subsidised in part by the Netherlands Indies Civil Administration, a continuation of the former Dutch colonial government of the Indies.

Production

SPFC hired Andjar Asmara, a former journalist and stagewriter who had been active with The Teng Chun's Java Industrial Film before the Japanese occupation, to direct Djaoeh Dimata; he based the screenplay on his stageplay of the same name. However, as with his pre-war ventures, the native Indonesian Andjar was more of an acting and dialogue coach; the Dutch cinematographer, A.A. Denninghoff-Stelling, held more creative power over the final product. Max Tera served as assistant cinematographer on this black-and-white film.

The film starred Ratna Asmara (wife of Andjar), Ali Yugo, Iskandar Sucarno, and Djauhari Effendi, all of whom had previous theatrical experience. Ratna and Ali, together with Andjar, had been members of the travelling troupe Dardanella in the early 1930s and entered the film industry together in 1940 with Kartinah. Iskandar and Djauhari, meanwhile, had been active in the theatre during the occupation; both made their feature film debuts with Djaoeh Dimata.

Principal photography was conducted on sets constructed by artistic director Hajopan Bajo Angin in SFPC's studio in Jakarta. The company's equipment was of good quality, but conditions were detrimental to filming; a contemporary report notes that one take, done inside the studio, was ruined by the sound of a passing car. Filming, which took two to three months, was completed on 10 November 1948. Production costs were almost 130,000 gulden, which was partially obtained from ethnic Chinese backers. The film included multiple songs, including Gesang Martohartono's 1940 hit "Bengawan Solo".

A documentary detailing one day of the production, called Er wordt een film gemaakt ("A film is being made") exists in the Netherlands.

Release and reception
Djaoeh Dimata was released in late 1948, the first domestic feature film since Berdjoang. Despite this five-year gap, film critic Usmar Ismail writes that it did not stray from the formula which had been proven before the war, one which Indonesian film historian Misbach Yusa Biran notes focused on songs, beautiful scenery and romance. Roestam Sutan Palindih's Air Mata Mengalir di Tjitarum (Tears Flow in Citarum), which had similar themes, was released shortly after Djaoeh Dimata by the rival Tan & Wong Bros.; it proved the greater financial success. Only three domestic productions were released in 1948; the last was another SPFC production, entitled Anggrek Bulan (Moon Orchid), which was also directed by Andjar.

Reviews of the film, which was rated for all ages, were mixed. One in the Jakarta-based Het Dagblad found the film to have many (unspecified) weak moments as well as strong ones. It particularly praised Ali's acting as a blind man, as well as Denninghoff-Stelling's camerawork. Another reviewer, in the magazine Mestika, described Ratna as an "unprecedented tragedienne" capable of making viewers cry "unrestrained tears of emotion". After Djaoeh Dimata was released in Singapore in June 1949, a reviewer for The Straits Times praised the film's "fine photography and almost perfect sound".

Andjar directed two further films for South Pacific, Anggrek Bulan and Gadis Desa (Maiden from the Village; 1949). Ratna had no further acting roles, although in 1950 she became Indonesia's first female director with Sedap Malam (Sweetness of the Night), for Djamaluddin Malik's company Persari. Ali, Iskandar, and Djauhari remained active as actors, Ali and Iskandar through the 1960s and Djauhari until the 1970s. SPFC made another six films before shutting down at the end of the Indonesian National Revolution in 1949. A 35 mm copy of Djaoeh Dimata is stored at Sinematek Indonesia in Jakarta.

Notes

References

Works cited

 
 
 
 
 
 
 
 
 
 
 
 
 
 
 
 
 
 
  
 
 
 
 
 

Indonesian black-and-white films
Dutch East Indies films
Films directed by Andjar Asmara